Media technology may refer to:

Data storage devices
Art media technology – :Category:Visual arts media
Print media technology – :Category:Printing
Digital media technology – :Category:Digital media
Electronic media technology – :Category:Digital media or :Category:Electronic publishing
Media technology university programmes
Media psychology, the field of study that examines media, technology and the effect on human behavior